Markaz is a village in Heves County in northern Hungary's Mátra mountains, about 14 kilometres from Gyöngyös. The primary local industries are viniculture, fishing and tourism. The town has a population of 1,789, and an area of 25.61 sq. kilometers.

External links
 

Populated places in Heves County